The bush moa, little bush moa, or lesser moa (Anomalopteryx didiformis) is an extinct species of moa from the family Emeidae (lesser moa).

Description
It was the smallest known species of moa, only slightly taller than a turkey. As with all moa, they have with a sternum without a keel. They also have a distinctive palate. It inhabited much of the North Island and small sections of the South Island of New Zealand. Its habitat was dense lowland conifer, broad-leafed southern beech forests and scrubland. It possessed a sturdy, sharp-edged beak, suggesting that its diet was made up of twigs and other tough plant material.

Threats and extinction
Native predators included the Haast's eagle and Eyles' harrier. The species went extinct alongside other native New Zealand wildlife around 500-600 years ago, following the arrival and proliferation of the Maori people in New Zealand, as well as the introduction of Polynesian dogs.

Archaelogical remains
The most complete remains, a partially articulated skeleton with substantial mummified tissue and feathers were discovered in 1980 in Lake Echo Valley, east of Te Anau, Southland. It is now in the Southland Museum and Art Gallery, in Invercargill. Anomalopteryx fossils made up the bulk of moa fossils discovered in a swamp in 1912 in Clevedon.

Possible de-extinction
Scientists at Harvard University assembled the first nearly complete genome of the species from toe bones, thus bringing the species a step closer to being "resurrected" in the future by using the emu as a proxy.

References

External links
 Little Bush Moa. Anomalopteryx didiformis. by Paul Martinson. Artwork produced for the book Extinct Birds of New Zealand by Alan Tennyson, Te Papa Press, Wellington, 2006

Anomalopteryginae
Extinct flightless birds
Extinct birds of New Zealand
Late Quaternary prehistoric birds
Ratites
Holocene extinctions